Zanchi may refer to;

People
Antonio Zanchi, Italian baroque painter 
Girolamo Zanchi, Protestant theologian  
Manuela Zanchi, Italian Olympic water polo player
Marco Zanchi, Italian footballer

Products
Zanchi (cymbals), an Italian brand of percussion instruments

See also

 Zangi, members of a Turkic dynasty in Syria